Hoernerstown is an unincorporated community in South Hanover Township, Dauphin County, Pennsylvania, United States and is a part of the Harrisburg–Carlisle Metropolitan Statistical Area.

Hoernerstown was named for a family of settlers.

See also
Union Deposit, Pennsylvania
Sand Beach, Pennsylvania

References

Harrisburg–Carlisle metropolitan statistical area
Unincorporated communities in Dauphin County, Pennsylvania
Unincorporated communities in Pennsylvania